The In Step Tour was a concert tour through the United States and Canada, undertaken by American blues rock band Stevie Ray Vaughan and Double Trouble from 1989 to 1990. Launched in support of their fourth and final studio album In Step, this was the third tour to include keyboardist Reese Wynans, who joined the band in 1985. Stevie Ray Vaughan and Double Trouble achieved international fame when their debut album, Texas Flood, was released in June 1983. Throughout their subsequent concert tours, the group's success was confirmed as their performances consistently amazed and gratified their audiences. Similar to their previous tours, the In Step Tour was a minimalist production. The stage featured a simple light show that changed according to the mood of certain songs performed. Although Vaughan and Double Trouble never followed a set list, all ten songs from In Step were played at least once during the tour, and as many as seven of them were included in each of the band's performances.

Consisting of six legs and 136 shows, the In Step Tour began on May 4, 1989 in Vancouver and ended on August 26, 1990 in East Troy, Wisconsin. After the first two legs, Vaughan and Double Trouble co-headlined with Jeff Beck and Joe Cocker during the third and fifth legs, which were branded as "The Fire Meets the Fury" and "Power and Passion", respectively. The group had planned to embark on a European leg in September 1990, but it was canceled after Vaughan died in a helicopter crash following the East Troy concert on August 27, 1990, during a return flight to Chicago. Although the tour elicited a variety of reactions from music critics, it was generally well-received and garnered mostly favorable reviews. Along with being one of the highest-grossing concert tours of 1989, "The Fire Meets the Fury" leg was awarded for being the most creative tour package of the year by Pollstar magazine.

Background
Stevie Ray Vaughan and Double Trouble gained international fame after the release of their debut studio album Texas Flood in June 1983. Their second studio album, Couldn't Stand the Weather, and the supporting tour brought them to further commercial and critical success during the following year. After the addition of keyboardist Reese Wynans in 1985, the band released Soul to Soul and toured in support of the album, which was their first as a quartet. In Europe, the schedule of performances were canceled after Vaughan suffered from a substance abuse related illness, due to a long-term drug and alcohol addiction. He checked into a rehabilitation facility in Atlanta, where he stayed for four weeks and achieved sobriety; bassist Tommy Shannon checked into rehab in Austin.

Following their departure from rehab, Vaughan and Shannon reconvened with Double Trouble to begin the Live Alive Tour in November 1986, which supported the album that was released on November 17. Although Vaughan was nervous about performing while being sober, he received positive reassurance. Wynans recalled: "[He] had a little bit of self doubt. We rehearsed and were very encouraging to him." As the tour progressed, Vaughan was longing to work on material for the group's next LP, but in January 1987, he filed for a divorce from his wife Lenny, which restricted him of writing songs and recording an album for almost two years. After the proceedings were finalized in 1988, the band started recording their fourth and final studio album, In Step, at Kiva Studios in Memphis, where they worked with producer Jim Gaines.

Vaughan initially had doubts about his musical and creative abilities, but he gained more confidence as the sessions progressed. Shannon later recalled: "From my eyes, he went in scared to death ... In Step was, for him, a big growing experience." On January 21, 1989, the band took a break from recording and performed at a presidential inaugural celebration for George H. W. Bush in Washington, D.C. When the sessions concluded, they participated in a concert organized by the Greenpeace organization, which took place on April 8, 1989 at the Mount Smart Supertop in Auckland, New Zealand.

Touring personnel

Band:
 Stevie Ray Vaughan (Guitars, Vocals)
 Chris Layton (Drums)
 Tommy Shannon (Bass)
 Reese Wynans (Keyboards)

Management/Tour Staff:
 Paul "Skip" Rickert (Tour Manager)
 Mark Rutledge (Production Manager)
 Bill Mounsey (Stage Manager)
 René Martinez (Guitar Technician)
 John "Bondo" Bond (Keyboard Technician)
 Doug Alexander (Monitor Engineer) 
 Andy Elias (Set/Lighting Designer)
 Trey Hensley (Lighting Technician)
 Dan Stuart (Lighting Technician)
 Gary Kudrna (Sound Technician)
 David Conyers (Sound Technician)
 Alex Hodges/Strike Force (Talent Management)

Planning, itinerary, and billing

A rehearsal for the In Step Tour took place on May 3, 1989 at York Theatre in Vancouver, before the opening show at the city's Orpheum Theatre on the following night. Lighting technician Trey Hensley explained that Vaughan decided against lengthy rehearsals: "The band played all the time and didn't need rehearsal, and he didn't believe in spending money to rehearse." Like many of the group's preceding tours, which began ahead of the release of a new album, the tour started a month before In Step was released, giving fans a preview of new songs from the album. The first leg of the tour alternated between both indoor and outdoor venues, with 15 concerts that were mostly indoor arena and theatre shows in May. After the release of In Step on June 13, the band performed 25 concerts throughout the United States and Canada from June to September.

Two co-headlining legs in North America were subsequently planned—"The Fire Meets the Fury" with Jeff Beck from October to December 1989, and "Power and Passion" with Joe Cocker from June to July 1990. In preparation for the high-profile "The Fire Meets the Fury" leg of the tour, band management added Pennsylvania-based Lighting Designer Andy Elias to the touring staff. The simplistic light show was replaced with state-of-the-art technology, featuring "intelligent" Vari*Lite lighting fixtures. Rehearsals for "The Fire Meets the Fury" began at Paisley Park Studios in Minneapolis on October 23 and 24, before the official leg-opening Northrup Auditorium show on October 25. Both Vaughan and Beck were advertised as headliners and received equal billing for the tour. Vaughan's manager Alex Hodges commented: "We were very careful to have equal billing and everything done in a way that it would be hard to say anyone was taking advantage of the other."

During an extended break between the third and fourth legs of the tour, Vaughan recorded Family Style with his brother Jimmie Vaughan in March 1990. They worked with producer Nile Rodgers at Ardent Studios in Memphis, and it would be their first and only collaboration. The album was ultimately released in September 1990, a month after Vaughan's death. With the success of "The Fire Meets the Fury," Hodges made arrangements for the "Power and Passion" leg with Cocker: "We weren't trying to repeat the magic of the tour with Beck, but we thought it was a way to have a strong summer tour and give the fans something different."

Following the conclusion of "Power and Passion", Vaughan took a short break from touring with Double Trouble. In August 1990, he traveled to Hawaii, Australia and New Zealand, where he spent time vacationing with girlfriend Janna Lapidus. She later recalled the trip: "It was all one big barrel of laughs! We were goofballs." Shortly after they had returned to their Manhattan apartment in New York City, Vaughan left for Kalamazoo, Michigan on August 24, where he reconvened with the band to perform at the county fair. They then moved on to East Troy, Wisconsin, where they were booked for two nights as the opening act for Eric Clapton at Alpine Valley Music Theatre. Both shows, on August 25 and 26, were sold out with an audience of 40,000 each. The second show concluded with an encore jam session featuring Vaughan, Clapton, Robert Cray, Buddy Guy and Vaughan's brother Jimmie Vaughan. In 1993, Clapton recalled Vaughan's performance: "[It was] beyond anything that I could even describe ... there was nothing missing. There was no room for improvement."

After the show, Vaughan talked with Layton backstage, where he expressed his gratification of the band's performances and optimism for the future of their career. Layton recalled the conversation: "He was in great spirits ... We talked for, I guess, almost thirty minutes." In the early morning of August 27, 1990, Vaughan and three members of Clapton's touring entourage boarded a Bell 206B, which was the third in a series of four helicopters to travel to Chicago's Midway Airport. The pilot, who was unqualified to operate a helicopter in foggy weather conditions, failed to gain enough altitude to fly the aircraft over a nearby ski hill, where it crashed shortly after takeoff. Vaughan and the four others on board were all killed instantly. The band had originally planned to visit England, France and Switzerland in September after being absent from the European touring circuit for over two years, but the rest of the tour was canceled. Vaughan was buried in his hometown of Dallas, Texas on August 31, 1990.

Setlist

Typical Main Setlist 
 "The House Is Rockin'"
 "Tightrope"
 "Mary Had a Little Lamb" (Buddy Guy cover)
 "Pride and Joy"
 "Let Me Love You Baby" (Willie Dixon cover)
 "Texas Flood" (Larry Davis cover
 "Leave My Girl Alone" (Buddy Guy cover)
 "Superstition" (Stevie Wonder cover)
 "Cold Shot"
 "Couldn't Stand The Weather"
 "Life Without You"
 "Crossfire"
 "Riviera Paradise"

  "Voodoo Child (Slight Return)" (The Jimi Hendrix Experience cover)

Power and Passion Setlist 

 "Collins' Shuffle" (Albert Collins cover)
 "The House Is Rockin'"
 "Tightrope"
 "The Things That I Used to Do" (Guitar Slim cover)
 "Let Me Love You Baby" (Willie Dixon cover)
 "Mary Had a Little Lamb" (Buddy Guy cover)
 "Leave My Girl Alone" (Buddy Guy cover)
 "Wall of Denial"
 "You'll Be Mine" (Howlin’ Wolf cover)
 "Riviera Paradise"
 "Superstition" (Stevie Wonder cover)
 "Cold Shot"
 "Couldn't Stand The Weather"
 "Collins' Shuffle" (reprise) or Say What!
Encore:
 "Crossfire"
 "Voodoo Child (Slight Return)" (The Jimi Hendrix Experience cover)

Tour dates

References

Sources

 
 
 
 

1989 concert tours
1990 concert tours
Joe Cocker
Stevie Ray Vaughan concert tours